Syngonanthus chrysanthus is a species in the family Eriocaulaceae, native to southeastern Brazil. One cultivar of this species is Syngonanthus chrysanthus 'Mikado', which is also simply called 'Mikado'. It has a rosette-forming base of velvety leaves and long stems which display initially golden enclosed buds, forming creamy-white button flowers. This plant prefers an indoor setting with humid conditions and high light.

References

External links
 GBIF entry

Eriocaulaceae
Endemic flora of Brazil